Carex athrostachya is a species of sedge known by the common name slenderbeak sedge. It is native to western North America, including Alaska to central Canada, the western contiguous United States, and just into Baja California.

Description
Carex athrostachya grows in wet and seasonally wet areas, such as wetlands and meadows. It produces dense clumps of stems up to 80 centimeters tall. The inflorescence is a dense green to brown cluster one or two centimeters long.

References

External links
Jepson Manual Treatment - Carex athrostachya
Flora of North America
Carex athrostachya - Photo gallery

athrostachya
Flora of the Western United States
Flora of Western Canada
Flora of Alaska
Flora of Baja California
Flora of California
Flora of Nevada
Flora of Oregon
Flora of the Sierra Nevada (United States)
Plants described in 1868
Taxa named by Stephen Thayer Olney